Escadron de Drones 1/33 Belfort is a French Air and Space Force (Armée de l'air et de l'espace) Drone Squadron located at BA 709 Cognac – Châteaubernard Air Base, Charente, France which operates the General Atomics MQ-9 Reaper with a detachment at Diori Hamani International Airport, Niamey, Niger.

The first Reaper flight in Africa took place on January 15, 2014 and in France took place on July 4, 2017.

See also

 List of French Air and Space Force aircraft squadrons

References

French Air and Space Force squadrons